Theodorus Gerardus Jozef Jansen (born 14 March 1948) is a Dutch artist. In 1990, he began building large mechanisms out of PVC that are able to move on their own and, collectively, are titled Strandbeest. The kinetic sculptures appear to walk. His animated works are intended to be a fusion of art and engineering. He has said that "The walls between art and engineering exist only in our minds." He strives to equip his creations with their own artificial intelligence so they may avoid obstacles such as the sea, by changing course when detected.

Early life
Jansen was born in Scheveningen in the Netherlands. He grew up with a talent for both physics and art, and studied physics at the Delft University of Technology. Jansen left the university in 1974 without a degree. While at Delft, Jansen was involved in many projects that involved both art and technology, including a paint machine and a flying-saucer machine.

Flying saucer
In 1979 Jansen started using cheap PVC pipes to build a -wide flying saucer that was filled with helium. It was launched over Delft in 1980 on a day when the sky was hazy. Light and sound came from the saucer. Because the saucer was black against a light sky, its size was difficult to determine. The police even stated that it was 30 meters wide, and some people swore they saw a halo around it. Jansen has claimed that this project "caused a near-riot". He said that the machine was never found, and that it probably landed somewhere in Belgium. He later repeated the project over Paris.

Painting machine
Jansen's painting machine was developed in 1984–86 in Delft, and it was a somewhat larger project than his flying saucer. It consisted of a tube with a light cell situated at its end. When darkness was detected, the machine would begin to spray paint, creating painted silhouettes of people standing in front of it. This machine  was also attached to a large piece of wood that was hoisted against a wall, where it would move back and forth to create 2-D images of everything in the room.

The strandbeest

Since 1990, Jansen has been creating strandbeesten (Dutch for "beach animals", singular strandbeest), which are moving kinetic structures, sometimes wind-propelled, that resemble walking animals, described by Jansen as artificial life. All of his models are based on a system of triangles and connecting links which convert the rotation of an axle into a stepping motion of six or more legs. This allows the strandbeesten to travel over sand much more efficiently than if it were to travel on wheels. What was at first a rudimentary "breed" has evolved slowly, with the help of evolutionary computation techniques, into a generation of kinetic sculptures that can react to their environment to some degree. According to Jansen, he was inspired by The Blind Watchmaker by Richard Dawkins. Jansen has said "I make skeletons that are able to walk on the wind. Over time, these skeletons have become increasingly better at surviving the elements such as storms and water and eventually I want to put these animals out in herds on the beaches, so they will live their own lives."

Constructed from PVC piping, wood, fabric airfoils, and zip ties, Jansen's sculptures are constantly being improved and are designed to function in the sandy beach environment in which Jansen releases them. The sculptures are also able to store air pressure in order to propel themselves in the absence of wind.  Jansen's more sophisticated creations are able to detect when they have entered water and are then able to move away from it. One model is capable of anchoring itself to the earth if an approaching storm is sensed.

A 2016 episode of The Simpsons, "The Nightmare After Krustmas", featured the strandbeesten and Jansen. He provided the voice for his cartoon character.

See also
 Jansen's linkage – leg mechanics
 Soda Constructor – an online physics-simulation game enabling the design of virtual Jansen-like creations
 Genetic algorithms – the method used in the design of the sculptures' legs

References

External links

 Strandbeest.com – web site with video and photographs of the sculptures
 Strandbeestmovie.com – documentary film about Theo Jansen by Alexander Schlichter – the web site is a workbook with videos and pictures
 
 "My creations, a new form of life" (TED2007)
 
 Real-time 2-D simulation of Jansen's sculpture using the APE physics engine
 Strandbeest: Theo Jansen from Art Futura, 2005
 Theo Janssen Machine in Mathcad on PlanetPTC

1948 births
Living people
Dutch sculptors
Dutch male sculptors
Artists from The Hague